The Gal Who Took the West is a 1949 American Western film directed by Frederick de Cordova starring Yvonne De Carlo, Charles Coburn, Scott Brady and John Russell. It was nominated for an award by the Writers Guild of America 1950.

Plot
A journalist is writing an article on the O'Hara family of Arizona. They tell about the time in the 1890s when a girl, Lily, was caught in a feud between two O'Haras.

Cast
 Yvonne De Carlo as Lillian 'Lily' Marlowe
 Charles Coburn as Gen Michael O'Hara
 Scott Brady as Lee O'Hara
 John Russell as Grant O'Hara
 Myrna Dell as Nancy
 James Millican as Hawley 
 Clem Bevans as Hawley (as old Timer)
 Robert R. Stephenson as Ted (as Bob Stevenson)
 Houseley Stevenson as Ted (as old Timer)
 Robin Short as Bartender
 Russell Simpson as Bartender (as old Timer)
 John Litel as Colonel Logan
 James Todd as Douglas Andrews
 Edward Earle as Mr. Nolan

Production
The film was originally known as The Western Story. It was the idea of William Bowers, about three interpretations of a single incident in the life of a Western pioneer; it would be told in flashback from an old person's home. Bowers says he got the idea from reading an article in Life magazine about old gunfighters who lived in an old person's home in Prescott Arizona. Bowers was under contract to Universal at the time for $750 a week, and says he wrote the script in four weeks. Bowers says Billy Wilder wanted to buy the script for $100,000 and Universal were interested, but Bowers persuaded the studio to make the film themselves.

William Bowers and Robert Arthur were assigned to make it in December 1947.

In April 1948, Deanna Durbin and Charles Coburn were announced for the lead roles. Jerome Hines was signed for a support role.

By November, Durbin had dropped out and Universal replaced her with Yvonne De Carlo. (Bowers says Susan Hayward was going to star but Universal decided to use their contracted talent "and it went right out the window") Stephen McNally and Howard Duff were given support roles. They dropped out and were replaced by Scott Brady and John Russell (the latter borrowed from 20th Century Fox).

Filming started in February 1949. The film was retitled The Gal Who Took the West during editing.

References

External links

1949 films
Films directed by Frederick de Cordova
1949 Western (genre) films
American Western (genre) films
Universal Pictures films
Films scored by Frank Skinner
1940s American films